Category E can refer to:

 Category E stations (DfT)
 Category E necrophiliacs, known as dabblers
 Category E Olympic sports
 Category E flight instructor (New Zealand)